Jeffrey Shuren is the Director of the Center for Devices and Radiological Health (CDRH) at the United States Food and Drug Administration (FDA) as of September 2009. According to Shuren,

Our center experts and programs help get safe and effective technology to patients and health care professionals on a daily basis. Rapid technological advances enable us to approve such innovations as a diagnostic test for the H1N1 influenza virus, an expandable prosthetic rib for children with abnormal growth conditions, and a test that can help detect ovarian cancer.

Shuren was responsible for the development of Medicare national coverage determinations for drugs, biologics, and non-implantable devices, while director of the Division of Items and Devices, Coverage and Analysis Group at the Centers for Medicare and Medicaid Services.

Education
 B.S. in Medical Education, Northwestern University
 M.D. in Medical Education, Northwestern University
 Residency: Neurology, Tufts UniversitySchool of Medicine
 Fellowship: University of Florida College of Medicine, Behavioral Neurology and Clinical Neuropsychology
 J.D., University of Michigan

References 

Living people
American neurologists
Directors of government agencies
University of Michigan Law School alumni
Food and Drug Administration people
American healthcare managers
Year of birth missing (living people)